Justin Lavender (born 4 June 1951) is an operatic tenor, a professor of vocal studies at the Royal College of Music and co-founder and Musical Director of Arcadian Opera.

He was educated at Bedford Modern School, Queen Mary College London and the Guildhall School of Music and Drama. Although he initially intended to train as a nuclear engineer he was persuaded by Sir Peter Pears and Benjamin Britten to pursue a career in music.
Following his debut in 1980 as Nadir in Bizet's Les pêcheurs de perles at the Sydney Opera House, Lavender has performed with most of the world's major orchestras and opera companies. In addition to his operatic performances, Lavender is a professor of vocal studies at the Royal College of Music, an honorary professor of the Confucius Institute at Pfeiffer University, and from 2009 to 2020 was vocal consultant to the Choir of King's College Chapel, Cambridge.

In 2015 Lavender co-founded the community opera company, Arcadian Opera, which performs regularly at Stowe, Buckingham.

Operatic performances 

 1980 – professional debut as Nadir in The Pearl Fishers (Sydney Opera House)
 1990 – debut as Arnold in Rossini's Guillaume Tell (Royal Opera House)
 1990 – debut as Tamino in Die Zauberflöte (Vienna State Opera)
 1991 – debut and title role in Rossini's Le comte Ory (La Scala, Milan)
 1993 – debut as Demodokos in Dallapiccola's Ulisse (Salzburg Festival)
 2004 – title role in Gounod's Faust (Royal Opera House)

Concert performances 

 1988 – Schubert's Mass in E Flat (Giulini and Berlin Philharmonic)
 1988 – Bartók's Cantata Profana (Solti and London Philharmonic)
 1991 – Schnittke's Faust Cantata (Abbado and Vienna Symphony)
 1996 – Elgar's The Dream of Gerontius (Slatkin and Philharmonia)
 2001 – Schnittke's Faust Cantata (Slatkin and BBC)

Film 

 2002 – appeared in The Life of David Gale

Recordings 

 1983 – video of Oedipus Rex
 1989 – audio of La Noche Triste
 1991 – audio of La Favorite
 1993 – audio of Messiah
 1993 – audio of I Puritani
 1993 – video of Mitridate
 1994 – audio of The Wreckers
 1994 – audio of Rossini and Donizetti arias
 1996 – audio of Britten Song Cycles
 1996 – audio of Bomtempo Mattutina dei Morti
 1997 – audio of Mozart Arias
 1998 – audio of Alceste
 1999 – audio of War and Peace
 2004 – audio of Schnittke Faust Cantata
 2006 – audio of Elgar's Dream of Gerontius
 2008 – audio of Janáček Otčenas

References

External links 
 Profile of Justin Lavender at the Royal College of Music

Operatic tenors
20th-century British male opera singers
British tenors
Vocal coaches
Academics of the Royal College of Music
Alumni of the Guildhall School of Music and Drama
Alumni of Queen Mary University of London
1951 births
Living people
People educated at Bedford Modern School
21st-century British male opera singers